The LifeCam is a lineup of webcams from Microsoft for PC users marketed since 2006. Various models and series of webcams are designed for either laptops or desktops.

VX Series

History 
The VX series of Microsoft LifeCam debuted on 13 June 2006, and were available for sale in August 2006 as Microsoft's first entry into selling webcams, with only two models, the VX-3000 and VX-6000. One of the exclusive features include the integration with Windows Live Messenger, by having a Windows Live Call button that can be used to easily initiate a video call.

These models both feature a similar round body design, with a round base, known as the Universal Attachment Base.

The entire series was designed for desktop use, as it used a base for attaching it to a desktop monitor. All webcams of this series interface via USB.

Specifications

NX Series 
All webcams of the NX series are designed for notebooks and interfaces via USB 2.0.

Specifications

LifeCam Show
 2.0 megapixel sensor
 8.0 megapixel still images (interpolated)
 21-60" focused depth of field (fixed focus)
 71-degree wide angle lens
 Comes with many attachments: Magnet disc, clip, and its own stand—it can be used on both desktop and laptop computers.
Released: Sep 2008

LifeCam Cinema
 
 720p 16:9 1/4" OmniVision OV9712 Sensor
 5.0 megapixel still images (interpolated)
 Autofocus
 Built-in microphone
 73,5-degree wide angle glass lens 
 4"-∞ depth of field (autofocus)
Released: Aug 2009

LifeCam Studio
 1080p 16:9 Sensor 
 8.0 megapixel still images (interpolated)
 Autofocus
 Built-in microphone
 75-degree wide angle glass lens 
 Tripod thread
Released: Sep 2010

HD Series 

These series debuted in March 2010 and uses Microsoft's TrueColor technology for improved color balance. They all have 720p HD video resolution and have built-in microphones.

Specifications

References

External links
 MSFT Hardware - LifeCam home

Microsoft hardware
Webcams
Videotelephony